Lectionary 259, designated by siglum ℓ 259 (in the Gregory-Aland numbering) is a Greek manuscript of the New Testament, on parchment. Palaeographically it has been assigned to the 13th century. Scrivener labelled it as 76a, Gregory by 83a. The manuscript has survived in a fragmentary condition.

Description 

The codex contains lessons from the Acts of the Apostles and Epistles lectionary (Apostolarium), with numerous lacunae.
Only 14 leaves of the codex have survived.
The text is written in Greek large minuscule letters, on parchment, in two columns per page, 22 lines per page. It contains nine lessons from 2 Timothy 3:2-9; Romans 5:18–21; 8:3–9; 9:29–33; 2 Corinthians 5:15–21; Galatians 3:28–4:5; Colossans 1:18–22; Philemon 3:3–9; Romans 8:8–14.

History 

Scrivener and Gregory dated the manuscript to the 13th century. It has been assigned by the Institute for New Testament Textual Research (INTF) to the 13th century.

According to the colophon it was written by Simeon, a reader, the date vanished (in red).

The manuscript was found by E. B. Nicholson.

The manuscript was added to the list of New Testament manuscripts by Scrivener (number 76a) and Gregory (number 83a). Gregory saw the manuscript in 1883.

The manuscript is not cited in the critical editions of the Greek New Testament (UBS3).

The codex is housed at the Bodleian Library (Auct. T. inf. 2.11) in Oxford, England.

See also 

 List of New Testament lectionaries
 Biblical manuscript
 Textual criticism
 Lectionary 258

Notes and references

Bibliography 

 

Greek New Testament lectionaries
13th-century biblical manuscripts
Bodleian Library collection